Svarte is a locality situated in Ystad Municipality, Skåne County, Sweden with 902 inhabitants in 2010.

References 

Populated places in Ystad Municipality
Populated places in Skåne County